Delta Force is a United States military special operations unit.

The term may also refer to:

 Project DELTA, a Vietnam War era United States special forces unit
 Delta Force F.C., a Nigerian football club
 Delta Force: America Strikes Back! (role playing game) Task Force Games developed RPG from 1986

 Delta Force (series), a first-person shooter video game series
 Delta Force (video game), a 1998 video game
 Delta Force 2, a 1999 video game
 Delta Force: Land Warrior
 Delta Force: Task Force Dagger
 Delta Force: Urban Warfare
 Delta Force: Black Hawk Down
 Delta Force: Black Hawk Down – Team Sabre
 Delta Force: Xtreme 1
 Delta Force: Xtreme 2
 Delta Force: Angel Falls

 Delta Force feature film series
 The Delta Force, a 1986 action movie
 Delta Force 2: The Colombian Connection (1990 film), second action movie in the series
 Delta Force 3: The Killing Game (1991 film), third action movie in the series

See also
 Delta Farce (2007 film) comedy film
 Operation Delta Force (film series), a telefilm direct-to-video series
 Delta Force Commando (1988 film) Italian action film

 Task Force Delta (disambiguation)
 Delta Force 1 (disambiguation)
 Delta (disambiguation)